The Dominican Republic national badminton team represents Dominican Republic in international badminton team competitions. It is controlled by the Dominican Republic Badminton Federation. The Dominican Republic team finished 5th in the 2018 Pan Am Badminton Championships.

The Dominican Republic hosted the 2017 Pan Am Badminton Championships and achieved 5th place. The national team also competes in the Pan American Games. They won a bronze medal in men's doubles.

Participation in Pan American Badminton Championships

Men's team

Women's team

Mixed team

Current squad 
The following players were selected to represent the Dominican Republic at the 2022 Pan Am Male & Female Badminton Cup.

Men
Wilmer Daniel Brea Nuñez
Cesar Adonis Brito González
William Cabrera
Nelson Javier
Yonatan Linarez
Angel Argenis Marinez Ulloa

Women
Alisa Juleisy Acosta
Mileiky Acosta
Noemi Almonte
Nairoby Abigail Jiménez
Clarisa Pie
Bermary Polanco

References

Badminton
National badminton teams
Badminton in the Dominican Republic